G-protein-signaling modulator 1 is a protein that in humans is encoded by the GPSM1 gene.

G proteins propagate intracellular signals initiated by G protein-coupled receptors. GPSM1, a receptor-independent activator of G protein signaling, is one of several factors that influence the basal activity of G protein signaling systems (Pizzinat et al., 2001).[supplied by OMIM]

References

Further reading